The Oratorio della Nunziatella is a 15th-century Renaissance-style oratory in Foligno, region of Umbria, Italy.

The oratory is located near the 18th-century Chiesa del Suffragio and is named after the Virgin of the Annunciation, considered in those days to be the patron saint of the city. It was restored in the 19th century. Among the decorations is the prominent fresco of the Baptism of Jesus painted between 1497 and 1507 by Pietro Perugino.

Sources
 Hospitalia 

Roman Catholic chapels in Italy
Roman Catholic churches in Foligno
15th-century Roman Catholic church buildings in Italy
Renaissance architecture in Rome
Tourist attractions in Umbria
15th-century establishments in Italy